Bentley is a suburb of Doncaster in South Yorkshire, England two miles north of the city of Doncaster. The population of the ward (also including Arksey, Shaftholme, Toll Bar and part of Scawthorpe) within the Metropolitan Borough of Doncaster at the 2011 Census was 14,191. The Bentley built-up area subdivision (including Arksey, Scawthorpe, Scawsby and Cusworth)  had a population of 27,145. 

Historically within the West Riding of Yorkshire, the village was once owned by Edmund Hastings of Plumtree, Nottinghamshire, who had inherited it from his wife Copley's Sprotborough family. Hastings subsequently sold the manor to John Levett, a York lawyer born at High Melton who married the niece of Hastings's wife, who then conveyed it to Sir Arthur Ingram of York, High Sheriff of Yorkshire.

A former mining village, it lies on the River Don. Bentley Colliery, which is now Bentley Community Woodland, closed in December 1993. Bentley and the nearby hamlet of Toll Bar were badly affected by floods in June 2007.

The local parish church of St. Peter dates back to 1891. A second church, Church of SS Philip and James in the New Village area was dedicated in 1915

Bentley includes West End, New Village and Rostholme. Streets in Bentley include Cooke Street and High Street.

During the 2019 United Kingdom floods residents of Bentley were asked to leave their homes after the area suffered flooding.

See also 
 Listed buildings in Doncaster (Bentley Ward)
 Bentley (South Yorkshire) railway station

References

External links

 Bentley Explosion at 7am Sunday 13 June 2010
Flood pictures 2007
BBC News - Residents braced for more floods, 30 June 2007
BBC News - Misery goes on for flood villages, 2 July 2007
Conveyance of Bentley, The Topographer and Genealogist, John Gough Nichols, 1858

Villages in Doncaster
Mining communities in England